Sagarika is an Indian singer and actress.

Sagarika may also refer to:

People
 Sagarika Ghatge (born 1986), Indian actress and models
 Sagarika Ghose (born 1964), Indian journalist, columnist and author
 Sagarika Gomes (1961-1989), Sri Lankan newscaster and aspiring artist

Media
 Sagarika (1956 film), an Indian Bengali film
 Sagarika (1998 film), an Indian Bengali film
 Sagarika (album), a Bengali album by Amit Kumar
 Sagarika (song), an Assamese song by Zubeen Garg
 Sagarika (TV series), Indian Bengali television series

Other
 Sagarika Express, Named passenger train of Bangladesh
 Sagarika (missile), Indian submarine ballistic missile

See Also
 

Sinhalese feminine given names